A gondola is a traditional Venetian rowing boat, best known today for transporting tourists.

Gondola may also refer to:

Places
 Gondola, Mozambique, the principal town of Gondola District, Mozambique
 Gondola Point, a community in New Brunswick, Canada
 Gondola Ridge, Antarctica

Transport

Compartments or platforms
 Gondola (airplane), a compartment on the underside of a powered fixed-wing aircraft
 Gondola (airship), an external equipment or passenger compartment attached to a powered blimp or dirigible
 Gondola (balloon), a payload basket or capsule suspended beneath an unpowered hot air or gas balloon
 Gondola (Ferris wheel), a passenger car or cabin or capsule attached to the rim of the wheel
 Gondola, a capsule in which a test subject is situated at the end of the rotating arm of a human centrifuge
 Gondola lift, or cable car, a type of aerial lift
Gondola, used to carry passengers in various types of aerial lift
Bicable gondola lift
Tricable gondola lift
 Gondola, the cargo or passenger platform suspended beneath a transporter bridge
 Gondola, a suspended platform used by window cleaners
 Gondola, major component of the Falkirk Wheel rotating boat lift in Scotland, UK
 Spy gondola, an observation compartment lowered beneath an airship

Vehicles
 Gondola (rail), a type of railroad car with an open top and enclosed sides, for carrying loose bulk materials
, an 1859 preserved steam yacht operated by the National Trust on Coniston Water, England

Other uses
 Gondola (retail), a free-standing display unit
 Gondola (magazine), a Belgian retailing monthly
 Gondola Group, a restaurant chain with 600 locations in the UK and Republic of Ireland
 "Gondola no Uta" ("The Gondola Song")
 House of Gondola, a noble family from Dubrovnik, Croatia
 1891 Gondola, an asteroid

See also
 
 
 Gondolier (disambiguation)
 Gundalow, a type of flat bottom cargo boat once common on the rivers of New England, US
 List of gondola lifts
 Gundulić, a noble family from Dubrovnik, Croatia